Shin Kishida (17 October 1939 – 28 December 1982) was a Japanese television, film, and stage actor.

Biography
Shin Kishida was born at Kawakita General Hospital in Asagaya, Suginami, Tokyo. His uncle was playwright Kunio Kishida, and actress Kyōko Kishida and children's author Eriko Kishida were his first cousins. He lived in Nakano until the age of five.

In 1944 he enrolled in Yumoto Elementary School in Hakone, Kanagawa, where he was sent to live as part of a wartime evacuation of children from major cities. He returned to Tokyo in 1947, and transferred to Kudan Elementary School, Chiyoda, Tokyo. After graduating from Kojimachi Junior High School (Kojimachi Chugakko, where he became friends with future politician Koichi Kato) and Kaijo High School (Kaijo Koko), he took a year off from his studies before entering the English literature department of Hosei University. However, he dropped out in his second year after deciding to become an actor.

Debut
In 1961 Kishida joined a drama study group attached to the Bungakuza theater troupe. The following year he joined Bungakuza as an apprentice and became a full-fledged member in 1965, but left in early 1966 to form the theater group Rokugatsu Gekijo (June Theater) with his wife Chiho Yuki, Katsumi Matsumura and others, and subsequently concentrated on film and television work.

Kishida may be best-remembered for playing Hammer-esque vampires in Toho's Bloodthirsty film series. Many Japanese fans regard Kishida and Christopher Lee as the quintessential screen vampires. Coincidentally, Kishida appeared alongside Shigeru Amachi, a pioneer of the Japanese vampire role in Nobuo Nakagawa's The Lady Vampire (Onna Kyuketsuki, 1959) on the 6th episode of the television period drama Mushuku Samurai in 1973. Kishida appeared in several works by Tsuburaya Productions including Return of Ultraman (Kaette kita Urutoraman) and Operation: Mystery! (Kaiki Daisakusen).

He wrote screenplays under the name Shin Akekawa, such as episode 35 of Return of Ultraman, "Zankoku! Hikari Kaiju Purizuma". Kishida's design for the light-inspired Prisma monster is widely regarded as the most beautiful of the second wave of Ultra Series monsters, and features in many books on the subject. As Shin Kishida he also wrote a script for episode 12 of the Tokusatsu show Fireman.

Kishida also worked frequently with director Kihachi Okamoto, and was a key figure in his latter works. His sidesplitting portrayal of a garish suit-wearing enemy yakuza captain in Dainamaito Dondon, and his turn as an eerie secretary to a political mastermind in Blue Christmas (the epitome of his stated desire to appear in brief supporting roles that change the tone of an entire film) are some of his most representative work.

He also formed a celebrated partnership with Akio Jissoji, a former colleague from his days working for Tsuburaya. His 1977 film, Utamaro's World (Utamaro: Yume to Shiriseba), was probably frequent Kishida's only lead role in a major production (although he does not headline the film), and was screened at the Cannes Film Festival.

From time to time, he deliberately shaved his head and wore a wig for his roles in the television series Kizudarake no Tenshi and Tantei Monogatari. In a guest appearance as "Phantom Thief #103" on the 13th episode of Tantei Monogatari, he engages in a fencing duel with star Yūsaku Matsuda towards the end. A thrust by Matsuda's character connects with the Phantom Thief's hair, ripping off his wig and exposing his bald pate with the number 103 neatly written on it.

Personal life
In 1964 Kishida married actress Chiho Yūki (who later changed her stage name to Kiki Kirin). They divorced in 1968. Kishida later remarried, but this second marriage also ended in divorce.

Influence
A regular in the works of directors Kihachi Okamoto, Akio Jissoji and Tatsumi Kumashiro, Kishida was revered by many actors including Kenichi Hagiwara, Yutaka Mizutani and Yūsaku Matsuda. Fellow Bungakuza actor Daigo Kusano was his lifelong best friend.

Shintaro Katsu also praised him highly for his talent and character, and appeared alongside him in several films. Kishida also worked as an instructor for Katsu's acting school "Katsu Academy". One of his students was Kazuki Kosakai.

Actor Asao Kobayashi, who co-starred with Kishida in Taiyo Sentai Sun Vulcan, was so overcome by the shock of Kishida's sudden death that he took a hiatus from acting and left show business permanently a few years later.

Death
On 28 December 1982, Kishida died of esophageal cancer, aged 43. Shortly after news of Kishida's death, television reruns of his final tokusatsu series "Solar Squadron Sun Vulcan" began in the Tokyo area, and his first appearance in the opening episode of the series was accompanied by a memorial message.

Filmography

Hôrô-ki (1962)
A Story Written with Water (1965) - Takao Matsutani 
Shayô no omokage (1967) - Keiji Taniyama
Kill! (1968) - Jurota Arao
Sogeki (1968)
Dankon (1969)
Red Lion (1969) - Secretary Sokichi
Hakucyu no syugeki (1970)
Zatoichi Meets Yojimbo (1970) - Kuzuryu
Onna Gokuakuchō (1970)
Genkai yûkyôden: Yabure kabure (1970) - Gisaburo Sakurai
Gekido no showashi 'Gunbatsu''' (1970) - (uncredited)Zenigeba (1970)Kitsune no kureta akanbô (1971) - Einoshin KatsuyaBattle of Okinawa (1971)Lake of Dracula (1971) - The VampireGekido no showashi: Okinawa kessen (1971)Mandara (1971)Inn of Evil (1971) - YoshinosukeThe Return of Ultraman (1971, TV Series) - Ken SakataUta (1972)Hyaku-nin no Daibôken (1972)Hyakuman-nin no dai-gasshô (1972) - MiyaharaLone Wolf and Cub: Baby Cart at the River Styx (1972) - Kuruma HidariNippon sanjûshi: Osaraba Tokyo no maki (1972) - MorikawaLone Wolf and Cub: Baby Cart in Peril (1972) - Kozuka EnkiKôkôsei burai hikae (1972) - MurakiFireman (1973, TV series) - Dr. Saburo MizushimaHanzo the Razor: The Snare (1973)Kaseki no Mori (1973)Oniwaban (1974) - Abbot GenkaiGodzilla vs. Mechagodzilla (1974) - Interpol Agent NanbaraLady Snowblood 2: Love Song of Vengeance (1974) - Seishiro KikuiEvil of Dracula (1974) - The PrincipalKarafuto 1945 Summer Hyosetsu no mon (1974)Aoba shigereru (1974)Asaki yumemishi (1974)Lost love: abura jigoku (1974)Kushi no hi (1975) - TabeKurobara shôten (1975) - JuzoHatsukoi (1975) - KimuraEden no umi (1976) - MatsushitaZoku ningen kakumei (1976)Hito goroshi (1976)Utamaro: Yume to shiriseba (1977) - UtamaroSugata Sanshiro (1977)Shag (1978) - Masao IkedaDainamaito don don (1978) - OsamuBlue Christmas (1978)Hakuchyu no shikaku (1979) - Koichi SumitaMidare karakuri (1979)Kindaichi Kosuke no boken (1979) - VampireYomigaeru kinrô (1979) - IshiiHowaito rabu (1979)Sûpâ gun redei Wani Bunsho (1979) - Tetsuo Ogata / Detective, Mika's BossEireitachi no oenka: saigo no sôkeisen (1979) - TeramotoG.I. Samurai (1979) - Naoe BungoSochô no kubi (1979) - AssassinOretachi wa Tenshi da! (1979 TV Series) - episode#5Dôran (1980) - KobayashiTokugawa ichizoku no houkai (1980) - Tokugawa Ie-mochi (14th-Sho-Gun)Shogun Assassin (1980) - Master of DeathHyôryû (1981)Morning Moon Wa Sozatsu Ni (1981)Chikagoro naze ka Charusuton (1981)Taiyo Sentai Sun Vulcan (1981-1982, TV Series) - Commander ArashiyamaConquest (1982) - IchikawaAntarctica'' (1983) - Kissaten Master

References

External links
 

1939 births
1982 deaths
Deaths from cancer in Japan
Deaths from esophageal cancer
Japanese male film actors
Japanese male television actors
Male actors from Tokyo
20th-century Japanese male actors